The 2023 Major League Baseball season is scheduled to begin on March 30, with the regular season planned to end on October 1. The 93rd All-Star Game is scheduled to be played on July 11, hosted by the Seattle Mariners at T-Mobile Park in Seattle, Washington. The postseason is scheduled to begin on October 3 and would end with a potential World Series Game 7 on November 4. 

This season sees the introduction of several rule changes. In an effort to create a quicker pace of play a pitch timer was introduced along with other minor changes, while limits on defensive shifts and larger bases were also introduced.

Schedule
On August 24, 2022, Major League Baseball released their 2023 schedule. There are 162 games scheduled for all teams. This will be the first MLB season of a new balanced schedule in which every team will play each other at least once like in the NBA and NHL. The new balanced schedule includes 13 games against their division rivals, totaling 52 games. Each team will play six games against six opponents and seven games against four opponents in the same league for a total of 64 games. Each team will also play 46 interleague games. Teams will also play a four-game home-and-home series.

As part of the "MLB World Tour", the San Francisco Giants and the San Diego Padres are scheduled to play a two-game series at Alfredo Harp Helú Stadium in Mexico City on April 29–30, while the St. Louis Cardinals and the Chicago Cubs are scheduled to play a two-game series at London Stadium in London on June 24–25. The 93rd All-Star Game is scheduled to be played on July 11, hosted by the Seattle Mariners at T-Mobile Park in Seattle. The MLB Little League Classic will feature the Philadelphia Phillies against the Washington Nationals on August 20.

Opening Day, March 30, features all thirty teams, the first time since 1968 that every team has started their season on the same day.

The MLB at Field of Dreams game will not be held due to the construction of a new youth baseball and softball complex at the Field of Dreams site near Dyersville, Iowa.

Rule changes
On September 8, 2022, MLB announced a set of rules changes that will take effect in 2023.
 A pitch clock will be introduced, with these requirements:
 A standardized period of 30 seconds between batters within each half-inning.
 A timer between pitches of 15 seconds with the bases empty, and 20 seconds with at least one runner on base.
 The pitcher must start his motion before the expiration of the pitch timer. A violation will result in an automatic ball.
 The batter must be in the box and alert to the pitcher with no less than eight seconds remaining. A violation will result in an automatic strike.
 With runners on base, the timer resets if the pitcher attempts a pickoff or steps off the rubber (collectively called a "disengagement").
 Only two disengagements are allowed per plate appearance; however, this count resets if a baserunner advances. Mound visits, injury timeouts, and offensive team timeouts do not count against this.
 On a third disengagement, an unsuccessful pickoff attempt will cause that runner to advance one base.
 If a team has used up all of its allowed five mound visits by the ninth inning, it receives an extra visit in the ninth.
 Umpires can provide extra time if circumstances warrant.
 Infield shifts will be restricted:
 The defensive team must have no fewer than four players in infield positions, with at least two on each side of second base.
 All infielders must have both feet on or inside the outer edge of the marked infield while the pitcher is on the rubber.
 Infielders cannot switch sides of the infield before a pitch is released.
 If infielders are improperly aligned at the time of the pitch, the offensive team may choose to accept the result of the play, or receive an automatic ball.
 All three bases will increase in size from 15 to 18 inches (38 to 46 cm).

Further changes were announced on February 13, 2023:
 In regular-season games, all extra innings will start with a runner on second base. This rule was first used in the COVID-abbreviated 2020 season, and again used in the lockout-shortened 2022 spring training.
 The rule that regulates when position players can pitch was tweaked. Previously, position players were allowed to pitch when either team had a lead of at least six runs. Starting with this season:
 The leading team can only use a position player in this role in the ninth inning, and with a lead of at least 10 runs.
 A team behind by eight or more runs can use a position player to pitch at any time in the game.
 The use of position players as pitchers in extra innings is unrestricted, as it was under the previous rule.

Managerial changes

General managers

Off-season

Field managers

Off-season

Uniforms

Wholesale changes
Starting with this season, all Major League teams will be limited to four uniform options plus a City Connect uniform. The four uniform options include a home, away, and two alternate uniforms.
The Twins have made changes to their logo and their uniforms. 
The Royals added powder blue pants to wear with the powder blue uniforms in select games.
Due to the aforementioned limit on team uniforms, the Mariners retired the gray road uniform and promoted their navy blue tops with gray pants as the primary road uniform. On games where the home team wears a navy alternate, the Mariners would don their Northwest Green alternates. 
The Rangers retired the red alternate home uniform due to the aforementioned uniform limit.
The Rays retired the gray road uniform and promoted their navy blue tops with gray pants as their primary road uniform. The 1998 Devil Rays throwback home uniform was promoted to a second alternate, to be used on Friday home games.

Uniform advertisements
Starting with this season, teams may add advertisement patches to their uniforms. The following teams have announced their uniform advertisements:
Arizona Diamondbacks: Avnet 
Boston Red Sox: MassMutual 
Cincinnati Reds: Kroger 
Houston Astros: Occidental Petroleum (OXY) 
Los Angeles Angels: Foundation Building Materials (FBM) 
San Diego Padres: Motorola

Anniversaries and special events

Broadcast rights

Television

National
This is the second year of the existing seven year deals with ESPN, Fox, TBS, Apple TV+, and MLB Network; and the second year of a two-year deal with NBC Sports/Peacock:

Linear television
 Fox will continue to air their Baseball Night in America slate of Saturday games as well the 2023 MLB All-Star Game. FS1 will also broadcast non-exclusive Saturday afternoon games along with some irregularly scheduled weeknight games. Jason Benetti will join Fox as a play-by-play announcer, replacing Aaron Goldsmith. Derek Jeter will join Fox Sports as a studio analyst.
 TBS will continue to broadcast MLB on TBS Tuesday Night. Most games are blacked out in the home markets of the teams playing, however TBS is allowed to co-exist once with a teams' local broadcast.
 ESPN will continue to broadcast Sunday Night Baseball (and has the option to show alternative broadcasts), as well as five other exclusive national games, and select Spring Training games, along with the Home Run Derby. ESPN+ will stream daily games, but they will be blacked out in the home markets of the teams playing. Select games may air on ABC and ESPN2.
 MLB Network will continue to broadcast games daily. While most games will be simulcasts of the home teams' regional sports network broadcast, select games will be produced by the network under its MLB Network Showcase banner. All games are blacked out in the home markets of the teams playing.

Streaming
 Apple TV+ continues to hold the rights to Friday Night Baseball. Wayne Randazzo and Alex Faust will be the new primary play-by-play commentators, replacing Melanie Newman and Stephen Nelson. Dontrelle Willis and Ryan Spilborghs will be the new primary color commentators, replacing Katie Nolan, Hunter Pence and Chris Young. Randazzo will partner with Willis, while Faust will partner with Spilborghs.
 Peacock will continue to air 19 MLB Sunday Leadoff games on Sunday afternoons. One game will be simulcast on NBC.
 YouTube has not yet renewed its deal for the MLB Game of the Week Live on YouTube. YouTube TV dropped MLB Network on February 1 in a carriage fee dispute.

French language
In Canada, TVA Sports will become the new national French-language home for the MLB. The channel will air 78 regular season games, the Home Run Derby, MLB All-Star Game, and the World Series.

Postseason
During the postseason, the ESPN networks (including ABC) will air all four Wild Card Series. TBS will then broadcast the National League Division Series and the National League Championship Series, and Fox Sports (Fox, FS1 and Fox Deportes) will broadcast the American League Division Series, the American League Championship Series and the World Series.

Local 
In January 2023, former New York Mets radio voice Wayne Randazzo was announced as the new lead play-by-play announcer for the Los Angeles Angels on Bally Sports West, replacing Matt Vasgersian. Vasgersian and Patrick O'Neal will continue to serve as substitutes for selected games.
In November 2022, Miami Marlins analyst J. P. Arencibia was released by Bally Sports.
In December 2022, Toronto Blue Jays color commentator Pat Tabler was released by Sportsnet.
In December 2022, St. Louis Cardinals play-by-play announcer Dan McLaughlin was released by Bally Sports. The Cardinals later announced that Atlanta Braves play-by-play announcer Chip Caray would take over the same role with the team.
In February 2023, Brandon Gaudin was announced as the new play-by-play announcer for the Atlanta Braves on Bally Sports South and Bally Sports Southeast.

AT&T Sportsnet closure
On February 24, 2023, the AT&T SportsNet regional sports networks sent a letter to the Rockies, Astros and Pirates saying they had until March 31, 2023, to reach an agreement to take their local television rights back. Warner Bros. Discovery, the owners of the networks, intends to leave the regional sports networks business. If a deal is not reached the networks will file for Chapter 7 bankruptcy. Root Sports Northwest is not affected because the Mariners already own majority control of that network. The Houston Astros and Houston Rockets are negotiating to take over AT&T SportsNet Southwest from Warner Bros. Discovery.

Diamond Sports bankruptcy
On February 15, 2023, Diamond Sports Group, owners of the Bally Sports regional sports networks, was unable to make a $140M interest payment, instead opting for a 30-day grace period to make the payment. On March 14, Diamond Sports officially filed for Chapter 11 Bankruptcy. During the bankruptcy, Diamond has missed payments to the Diamondbacks and Padres.

Radio

National 

 Jon Sciambi will succeed Dan Shulman as ESPN Radio's lead broadcaster, with Shulman now focusing primarily on his role at Sportsnet and the Toronto Blue Jays.

Local
Play-by-play announcer Glenn Geffner was let go by the Miami Marlins.
Steve Physioc retired from calling Kansas City Royals games and will be replaced by Jake Eisenberg.
Wayne Randazzo stepped down as play-by-play announcer for the New York Mets.
Jaime Jarrín retired from calling Los Angeles Dodgers games in Spanish after 64 seasons (1959–2022) and will be replaced by José Mota.
Dave Wills died on March 5.  He was the radio voice of the Tampa Bay Rays for 18 seasons. Wills was replaced by Neil Solondz.

Retirements
The following players retired during the 2023 season and before the start of the 2024 campaign:
Adam Wainwright – October 26, 2022 (announced); plans to retire after the season
Miguel Cabrera – November 28, 2022 (announced); plans to retire after the season
Lorenzo Cain – March 7, 2023 (announced); will retire as a Kansas City Royal during the summer

Retired numbers
Fernando Valenzuela will have his No. 34 retired by the Los Angeles Dodgers on August 11. This will be the 12th number retired by the team.

See also
2023 in baseball

References

External links
2023 Major League Baseball Schedule

 
Major League Baseball seasons
Baseball